5-DBFPV (also known as 5-dihydrobenzofuranpyrovalerone and 3-desoxy-MDPV) is a stimulant of the cathinone class that has been sold online as a designer drug. It is an analogue of MDPV where the methylenedioxyphenyl group has been replaced by dihydrobenzofuran.

Legal status 
5-DBFPV is illegal in Sweden as of 26. January 2016.

See also 
 3',4'-Dimethoxy-α-pyrrolidinopentiophenone, 3,4-DMPV
 α-Pyrrolidinopentiophenone (α-PVP)
 Pyrovalerone

References 

Designer drugs
Norepinephrine–dopamine reuptake inhibitors
Stimulants
Pyrrolidinophenones
Propyl compounds